Aleksey Yuryevich Yesin (born 3 December 1987) is a Russian speed skater. He finished 12th in the men's 1000 metres event at the 2013 World Single Distance Championships.

References

External links
 
 
 

1987 births
Russian male speed skaters
Speed skaters at the 2010 Winter Olympics
Speed skaters at the 2014 Winter Olympics
Olympic speed skaters of Russia
Universiade medalists in speed skating
People from Kolomna
Living people
World Sprint Speed Skating Championships medalists
Universiade bronze medalists for Russia
Competitors at the 2009 Winter Universiade
Sportspeople from Moscow Oblast